Parthenocissus quinquefolia, known as Virginia creeper, Victoria creeper, five-leaved ivy, or five-finger, is a species of flowering vine in the grape family, Vitaceae. It is native to eastern and central North America, from southeastern Canada and the eastern United States west to Manitoba and Utah, and south to eastern Mexico and Guatemala.

Etymology
"Parthenocissus" is derived from Greek and means "virgin ivy". "Quinquefolia" means "five-leaved". "Quinque" – "five" and "folia" – "foliage", "leaves".

Names
The name "Virginia creeper", referring to one of its native locations, is also used for the whole genus Parthenocissus, and for other species within the genus. The name Parthenocissus is from the Greek literally meaning "virgin ivy", and may derive from the common English name of this species. It is not closely related to the true ivy, Hedera. The specific epithet quinquefolia means "five-leaved", referring to the leaflets on each compound (palmate) leaf.

This plant is also known in North America as woodbine, although woodbine can refer to other plant species.

Description

It climbs smooth surfaces using small forked tendrils tipped with small strongly adhesive pads  in size.

Leaves
The leaflets have a toothed margin. Seedlings have heart-shaped cotyledon leaves. The species is often confused with P. vitacea or "False Virginia creeper", which has the same leaves, but does not have the adhesive pads at the end of its tendrils.

It is sometimes mistaken for Toxicodendron radicans (poison ivy), despite having five leaflets (poison ivy has three). While the leaves of P. quinquefolia do not produce urushiol, the sap within the leaves and stem contains raphides (needle-shaped crystals of calcium oxalate) which can puncture the skin causing irritation and blisters in sensitive people.

The leaves sometimes turn a decorative bright red in the fall.

Flowers and berries
The flowers are small and greenish, produced in inconspicuous clusters in late spring, and mature in late summer or early fall into small hard purplish-black berries  diameter. These berries contain toxic amounts of oxalic acid and have been known to cause kidney damage and death  to humans. The berries are not toxic to birds and provide an important winter food source for many bird species.

Cultivation and uses

Parthenocissus quinquefolia is grown as an ornamental plant, because of its ability to rapidly cover walls and buildings, and its deep red to burgundy fall (autumn) foliage. It can easily be propagated by stem cuttings taken in spring. 	

It is frequently seen covering telephone poles or trees. It may kill other plants it covers by shading its support and thus limiting the supporting plants' ability to photosynthesize. With its aggressive growth, it can overburden slower-growing understory trees with its weight, damaging them. Its ability to propagate via its extensive root system makes it difficult to eradicate.

In the UK, this plant is listed on Schedule 9 of the Wildlife and Countryside Act 1981 as an invasive non-native species. While this does not prevent it from being sold in the UK, or from being grown in gardens, the Royal Horticultural Society (RHS) encourages those that do grow it to take great care with managing it and with disposing of unwanted material. The RHS also encourages gardeners to find alternative plants to grow to those listed on Schedule 9.

Parthenocissus quinquefolia can be used as a shading vine for buildings on masonry walls.  Because the vine, like its relative P. tricuspidata (Boston ivy), adheres to the surface by disks rather than penetrating roots, it does not harm the masonry but will keep a building cooler by shading the wall surface during the summer. As with ivy, ripping the plant from the wall will leave the adhesive disks behind. If the plant clings to fragile surfaces it can first be killed by severing the vine from the root. The adhesive pads will then eventually deteriorate and release their grip.  

The plant should be trimmed regularly to keep it from growing into areas where it is not wanted.  If allowed to penetrate into the wall of a frame house, it will grow upward within the wall until it finds a place to emerge. The roots can penetrate a rock foundation and grow into the basement of an old house, extending long distances in search of moisture, and growing into floor cracks or drains.

See also
Vine, general article on climbing plants
 Thicket Creeper or False Virginia creeper (P. inserta or P. vitacea)
 Boston Ivy or Japanese creeper (P. tricuspidata, or Ampelopsis veitchii)

Gallery

References

External links

 CABI's Invasive Species Compendium at Centre for Agriculture and Bioscience International
 In USDA Plant Database
 In US Forest Service database
 Images at Vanderbilt University website
 
 

Flora of North America
Medicinal plants
quinquefolia
Vines
Plants described in 1753
Taxa named by Carl Linnaeus